Eddie Aleong (born 4 May 1937) is a Trinidadian former cricketer. He played four first-class matches for Trinidad and Tobago between 1959/60 and 1965/66.

References

External links
 

1937 births
Living people
Trinidad and Tobago cricketers